Obuya is a Kenyan surname. Notable people with the surname include:

 Collins Obuya (born 1981), Kenyan cricketer
 David Obuya (born 1979), Kenyan cricketer
 Kennedy Obuya (born 1972), Kenyan cricketer, brother of Collins and David

Surnames of African origin